Showtime Movie Channels is a group of Australian pay-TV movie channels, available on the Foxtel, Optus and Austar TV platforms. The service consisted of five original channels (showtime premiere, showcase, showtime action, showtime comedy, showtime drama), three HD simulcasts (showtime premiere HD, showcase HD, showtime action HD) and two timeshift channels (showtime two, showcase two). It was owned and operated by the Premium Movie Partnership (PMP), a joint venture in which Sony Pictures Entertainment, NBCUniversal, Viacom, News Corporation and Liberty Global had equal shares. Foxtel took over managing and producing the Showtime channels as of 31 October 2012, with it purchasing assets of the PMP. On 9 December 2012, it was announced that Movie Network and Showtime (with the exception of Showcase) would be replaced with a new line-up of Foxtel branded movie channels to be named Foxtel Movies

The main competitor to Showtime is Movie Network Channels.

History

Formed in late 1994 through a joint partnership between Australis Media, Columbia TriStar, MCA, Viacom and Tele-Communications Inc., Showtime started broadcasting in 1995 as part of the basic package on the now-defunct Galaxy service, showing first-run films. At the same time its sister channel named Encore was launched, showing older 'classic' movies. Until their launch in March 1995, trailers and previews were broadcast in their channel slots. Both channels were originally programmed in Burbank, California, until local operations commenced in October 1995. It later became available as part of the Austar and Foxtel services when they were launched. In December 2002, the Showtime channels also became available on Optus Television. Encore was renamed Showtime Greats on 1 March 2004, with a move to more contemporary films.

In September 2007 it was announced that a premium channel called showcase would be launched on 1 December 2007 as part of the suite of Showtime channels, ahead of changes that would allow Movie Network to compete directly with Showtime for subscribers.

showcase screens movies (mainly independent, arthouse and documentary features),some comedy programs as well as a number of television series.

On 15 November 2009, Showtime Greats was replaced by showtime action, showtime comedy and showtime drama. In addition, Showtime was renamed showtime premiere.

On 11 October 2012, Foxtel announced they would acquire certain assets of the Premium Movie Partnership, which would result in Foxtel managing and producing the Showtime channels as of 31 October 2012.

Channels
All showtime channels area available on Foxtel, Austar and Optus, unless otherwise noted. showtime premiere and showcase are also available through Xbox 360's IPTV service.

Showcase

Showtime Greats

Internet download services
Launched on 1 October 2009 were two exclusive channels to Foxtel Download. These were:
 Showtime Family – featured family friendly movies and was exclusive to Foxtel's download service.
 Showtime Horror – featured Classic and modern horror movies and was exclusive to Foxtel's download service.

Showtime Australia
Showtime Australia is unrelated to the American Showtime service, but pays a licence fee for the use of the name and trademark. It also produces some Australian movies, such as Bad Eggs, in conjunction with other companies.

Trademark and branding
Despite the name being Showtime, for branding purposes it is usually spelt in all capitals to match the channel logo. Similarly, Showcase is usually spelt in all lower case. As a matter of fact, the branding for Showtime uses the former logo from the American cable service until 1997.

See also
 Hallmark Channel

References

Movie channels in Australia
Television channels and stations established in 1995
Television channels and stations disestablished in 2012
Defunct television channels in Australia
English-language television stations in Australia